Víctor Estrella Burgos (born August 2, 1980)  is a retired Dominican professional tennis player. In 2014, Estrella became the first Dominican to reach the top 100 in the ATP rankings. He also became the first Dominican player to reach the semifinals in an ATP 250 tournament in Bogota. In 2015, he also became the first tennis player from his country to participate in all four Grand Slams, playing in the Australian Open. In February 2015, he won his first career ATP title at the Ecuador Open, becoming the oldest first-time ATP tour winner in the Open Era. He successfully defended his title with a 100% winning record at the event in 2016 and 2017, but lost in the second round in 2018.

Estrella has been a member of the Davis Cup team from the Dominican Republic since 1998, posting a record of 41–17 in singles and 21–22 in doubles. Since 2014 he belongs to the Dominican olympic program CRESO.

Estrella Burgos reached a career-high singles ranking of world No. 43, achieved on July 13, 2015. He achieved a career-high doubles ranking of world No. 135, achieved on the same date.

Junior career
Estrella Burgos began playing tennis at the age of 8.

Estrella Burgos played his first junior match in July 1996 at the age of 15 at a grade 5 tournament in the Dominican Republic. He did not play much junior tennis as he play just six tournaments in singles and five tournaments in doubles. His best result was a semifinal appearance at a grade 4 tournament in El Salvador in singles and a final appearance at a grade 4 tournament in the Dominican Republic in doubles. He did not play in any junior Grand Slams or any major junior tournaments.

Estrella Burgos ended his junior career with a high ranking of 360 in singles and 292 in doubles. He had an overall win–loss record of 9–6 in singles and 10–5 in doubles.

Career

2002–2013: Slow rise
Although playing his first ITF event in 2000, Estrella Burgos officially turned pro in 2002 at the age of 22. He reportedly did not take his career seriously until he was 26 when he decided that a career on the ATP Tour was the best option. For the first few years of his career, he played tournaments only located in The Americas. It wasn’t until 2011 where he started to play in other parts of the world. Throughout 2002-2013, he earned a handful of ITF titles while also improving his year-end ranking.

Highlights during this period include qualifying for his first ATP tournament, the 2008 Cincinnati Masters which he qualified for but lost to Fernando Verdasco in the first round, winning his first challenger title in 2011, and winning a gold medal at the 2010 Central American and Caribbean Games and a bronze medal at the 2011 Pan American Games, both in singles.

In October 2012, Estrella Burgos suffered an elbow injury. He was contemplating retirement during this time but returned to tennis in April 2013.

At the age of 32, Estrella Burgos picked up his first ATP win at the 2013 Colombia Open defeating Facundo Argüello in the first round.

2014: Breakout year
In early 2014, he became the first Dominican player to break into the top 100 and he started to qualify for ATP events and grand slams. His first grand slam was the 2014 French Open where he got an automatic qualification due to ranking but lost in the first round to 22nd seed Jerzy Janowicz in 4 sets.

At the 2014 Colombia Open, he went into the tournament as 8th seed and made the semifinals defeating the 1st seed and world number 14 Richard Gasquet along the way. He lost to eventual champion Bernard Tomic.

At the 2014 US Open, he made the third round which remains as his best result in a slam. He lost to Milos Raonic in straight sets which all went to tiebreaks.

At the 2014 Central American and Caribbean Games, Estrella Burgos repeated his gold medal feat from 2010 in singles and also won a bronze medal in mixed doubles.

Estrella Burgos would finish 2014 with a year-end ranking of 78 and a win–loss record of 9–10.

2015: Best year of career
At the 2015 Ecuador Open, Estrella Burgos made his first ATP final. In the final, he defeated top seed and world No. 14 Feliciano López to win his first ATP title. Not only did he become the first Dominican to win an ATP title, but the oldest first-time ATP champion in Open Era history. He also made the final of the doubles draw partnering João Souza but lost to Gero Kretschmer and Alexander Satschko in straight sets.

At the 2015 Barcelona Open, he recorded his only win over a top 10 player when he defeated world number 9 Marin Čilić. He also beat future world number 3 Dominic Thiem during the tournament.

On July 13, 2015, he reach his career-high ranking of 43 and would finish 2015 with his best year-end rankings of 56 and a win–loss record of 20–20.

2016–2017: More success on tour
Estrella Burgos made his second final in doubles at the 2016 U.S. Men's Clay Court Championship partnering Santiago González but lost to the Bryan brothers (Bob and Mike) in three sets.

He defended his title the Ecuador Open two more times in 2016 and 2017. He also played in the 2016 Summer Olympics but lost in the first round to Fabio Fognini in three sets.

He won his last challenger title in August 2017 against Damir Džumhur at the 2017 Santo Domingo Open in his home country of the Dominican Republic.

2018: Downfall
At the 2018 Australian Open, he played his last grand slam match against world number 1 Rafael Nadal. He lost in straight sets.

His win streak at the Ecuador Open ended at the 2018 edition with a second round loss to Gerald Melzer.

He played his last ATP match after qualifying for the 2018 Hall of Fame Open after qualifying for the main draw where he lost in the first round against eventual finalist Ramkumar Ramanathan in straight sets.

At the 2018 Central American and Caribbean Games, Estrella Burgos won three gold medals for singles, doubles, and team event. It would be the last time he attended the games.

At the 2018 US Open qualifying, Estrella Burgos defeated 2nd seed Jürgen Zopp and Bjorn Fratangelo to make the qualifying competition. He lost to Stefano Travaglia in straight sets.

Estrella Burgos' ranking dropped to a low of 326 in November and he ended the year with a win–loss record of 2–9 and a year-end ranking of 278. A severe dip from his win–loss record of 9–10 and year-end ranking of 83 in 2017.

2019: Retirement
On 5 August 2019, after playing in a few more challenger events and his ranking having dropped to 665 in the world, Estrella Burgos announced that he will retire from professional tennis. His last tournament was the Santo Domingo Open, which was played in October.

On October 7, he won his last match against Marcelo Arévalo. On October 8, Estrella Burgos played his last match against Thiago Monteiro. He was honored as one of the biggest retirees in 2019.

Davis Cup
Estrella Burgos made his Davis Cup debut in 1998 at the age of 17. During his time with the Dominican Davis Cup team, he posted a win–loss record of 43–17 in singles, 22–23 in doubles, and 65–40 overall.

In 2015, the Dominican Republic entered the world group playoff for the first time in their history and were paired up against Germany. Estrella Burgos won the opening match in the series when he defeated Dustin Brown in four sets. He would lose his second singles match against Philipp Kohlschreiber in straight sets and the Dominican Republic would lose the series 4–1.

Personal life
Estrella Burgos was born in Santiago de los Caballeros to father Elgio Felix and mother Ana. He also has three brothers; Hector, Henry and Felix.

Estrella Burgos' nickname is "Viti"

Estrella Burgos is also a big baseball fan and likes to go to many games.

Singles performance timeline

ATP career finals

Singles: 3 (3 titles)

Doubles: 2 (2 runners-up)

ATP Challenger and ITF Futures finals

Singles: 39 (28–11)

Doubles: 24 (9–15)

Record against top 10 players
Estrella Burgos's match record against players who have been ranked in the top 10,with those who are active in boldface. 
Only ATP Tour and Challenger main draw matches are considered.

Wins over top 10 players

Notes

References

External links

1980 births
Living people
Dominican Republic male tennis players
People from Santiago de los Caballeros
Tennis players at the 2016 Summer Olympics
Olympic tennis players of the Dominican Republic
Tennis players at the 2007 Pan American Games
Tennis players at the 2011 Pan American Games
Pan American Games bronze medalists for the Dominican Republic
Pan American Games medalists in tennis
Central American and Caribbean Games gold medalists for the Dominican Republic
Central American and Caribbean Games silver medalists for the Dominican Republic
Competitors at the 2002 Central American and Caribbean Games
Competitors at the 2006 Central American and Caribbean Games
Competitors at the 2010 Central American and Caribbean Games
Competitors at the 2014 Central American and Caribbean Games
Tennis players at the 2019 Pan American Games
Central American and Caribbean Games medalists in tennis
Tennis players at the 2003 Pan American Games
Medalists at the 2011 Pan American Games